Kenneth McLean (born 8 January 1992) is a Scottish professional footballer who plays as a central midfielder or left midfielder for  club Norwich City and the Scotland national team.

After being released by  Rangers' youth team, McLean started his senior career at SPL club St Mirren. He went on loan to Second Division side Arbroath for the second half of the 2009–10 season, before returning to St Mirren and breaking into the first team. He moved to Aberdeen in 2015. In January 2018, he joined Norwich City but was loaned back to Aberdeen until the end of the season.

He represented Scotland at the under-19 and under-21 international levels before making his debut for the senior Scotland team in 2016.

Club career

Early life and career
McLean was born in Rutherglen and attended Cathkin High School in Cambuslang. He spent time with the youth setups of both Aberdeen and Rangers as a schoolboy. In 2008, he decided not to renew his Rangers contract and joined St Mirren.

Arbroath (loan)
McLean moved on loan from St Mirren to Second Division club Arbroath in December 2009. Arbroath signed McLean, along with Kilmarnock striker Daniel McKay, to cover for injuries. On 12 December, McLean made his debut for Arbroath in a 4–3 loss to Stirling Albion. Shortly after this match, Arbroath signed McLean's St Mirren teammate Kyle Faulds on loan. On 10 April, McLean scored his only goal for Arbroath, a penalty kick in a 4–2 loss against Stirling Albion. He made a total of 23 appearances during the second half of the 2009–10 season. Arbroath were relegated to the Third Division at the end of the season, after losing to Forfar Athletic in the relegation play-off. McLean has said that his loan spell at Arbroath helped him develop as a player and also to become more mature.

St Mirren

Eighteen-year-old McLean made his debut on 17 October 2010, coming on as a substitute in a 2–2 draw against Hamilton. St Mirren were 2–0 down when he came on and their manager, Danny Lennon, thought that they were going to lose anyway so he would bring a youngster on. However, The Herald noted that McLean's "drive and energy" lifted St Mirren and helped them to turn the game around and get a draw. Three days after his debut, McLean made his first start for St Mirren, in a 3–0 loss to Hearts. Later in the week he signed a three-year contract extension, tying him to the club until 2014. He then made his first home start, in a 1–0 loss to Celtic on 16 November. After this match he thanked his manager for having faith in him and also said that he was amazed by the fact that only six months before he was playing in the Second Division relegation play-off, but was now playing against some of the best players in the country. He went on to make a total of 23 appearances during the 2010–11 season.

Sky Sports said that during the 2011–12 season McLean had begun to emerge as one of the top young talents in the SPL. His first game of the season was on 6 August, in a 1–1 draw against Dundee United, where he came on as an 80th-minute substitute. His first start came a week later in a 1–0 loss to Motherwell. McLean then played regularly in the first team over the next few months and was in excellent form. He scored his first senior goal in a 1–0 win over St Johnstone on 29 October and was rewarded with the SPL Young Player of the Month award for October 2011. After this, teammate Gary Teale said that he thought McLean was very similar to former Rangers and Scotland captain Barry Ferguson, and that he thought McLean would have a brilliant future in the game. In the weeks leading up to his award, McLean had been watched by English Championship clubs Burnley and Crystal Palace, with Celtic also reportedly interested in him. Lennon encouraged interest from other clubs, saying that he took it as a compliment to McLean's development. But he also said that he would not consider selling McLean in the near future and expressed his delight at the fact that he had already signed McLean on a long-term contract. On 19 November, McLean scored his second goal for St Mirren, in a 2–1 win over Dunfermline Athletic. He then scored St Mirren's first goal, on 10 December, as they came from behind to secure a 2–2 draw against Aberdeen. McLean was one of the four players nominated for the SPL young Player of the Year Award. In January 2014 it was announced that McLean would be out-of-action for 6 weeks following knee surgery.

On 2 July 2014 it was announced that McLean had a signed a two-year contract extension with the club, following much speculation that he would leave the club in the summer.

Aberdeen
McLean signed a three-and-a-half-year contract with Aberdeen on 2 February 2015, for a reported transfer fee of around £300,000. He made his debut for the club the following weekend in a league game against Ross County, which Aberdeen won 4–0. On 16 July 2015, McLean scored his first goal for Aberdeen in a 3–0 win away to HNK Rijeka in the second qualifying round first leg of the Europa League. McLean scored his first league goal for Aberdeen in a 1–0 win over Dundee United on the opening day of the 2015–16 season.

In November 2017, McLean confirmed that he would not be renewing his Aberdeen contract when it expired the following summer.

Having helped the team to finish runners-up in the 2017–18 Scottish Premiership – as in each of his other three campaigns with the club – McLean finally departed Aberdeen after making 158 appearances and scoring 25 goals during his spell at Pittodrie (including the loan back after signing for Norwich).

Norwich City
McLean was sold in January 2018 to Norwich City, who loaned him back to Aberdeen for the rest of the season.

Having missed a portion of his first season in English football with an ankle ligament injury, in December 2018 he commented that he was determined to prove he was good enough. He returned to the Canaries team to help the club gain promotion to the Premier League as winners of the 2018–19 EFL Championship, with his enthusiastic title celebrations (addressing the crowd of supporters as the 'Mayor of Norwich' with a ceremonial hat and bottle of fortified wine) receiving media attention. In the 2019 close season, he signed an improved contract.

International career
McLean earned his first call-up for Scotland under-19 squad in October 2010, coming on as a 58th-minute substitute in a 4–2 win over Norway.

In March 2011, he was called up to the under-21 team. Making his debut, again from the bench, as Scotland beat Belgium 1–0. He was not selected for the Scotland under-21 team to play in a 2013 European Under-21 Football Championship qualification match against the Netherlands on 14 November 2011. St Mirren manager Danny Lennon expressed his surprise at McLean being left out of the squad. The Herald said that this was understandable given that he was "among the on-form midfielders of his age group" at the time.

McLean received his first call-up to the senior Scotland squad in March 2016, for a friendly against Czech Republic. McLean made his international debut in that game, playing 57 minutes. He was called up again in October 2017, for a friendly match against the Netherlands.

He scored his first Scotland goal in March 2019 in a 2–0 away win against San Marino.

McLean scored the winning penalties as Scotland beat Israel and Serbia in shootouts to secure qualification for UEFA Euro 2020 via playoffs. McLean missed the tournament itself due to a knee ligament injury suffered in the last game of the 2020–21 EFL Championship season.

Style of play
McLean's favoured position is as a central midfielder, but he can also play as a left midfielder. He has said that he favours playing in the centre because he can get more of the ball and influence play more than when he is on the left. He is a naturally attacking player and when playing in the centre he makes runs to and beyond the striker which adds an extra dimension to his team's play.

Former Scotland international, and McLean's teammate at St Mirren, Gary Teale has compared him to Barry Ferguson. Teale said that McLean had shown incredible maturity at such a young age and that from their first training session together he could see McLean's talent. McLean has an excellent first touch and is also very composed and assured on the ball. McLean also has very high energy, work rate and athleticism which enable him to make many attacking runs. McLean's manager at St Mirren, Danny Lennon, said that he thought McLean was an excellent passer and that he could "open a tin of beans" with his left foot and was also decent with his right. Lennon also said that McLean was a rare type of Scottish player because he was always looking for a 'slide-rule' pass and he was actually capable of delivering them.

Career statistics

Club

International

Scores and results list Scotland's goal tally first.

Honours
Norwich City
EFL Championship: 2018–19, 2020–21

References

External links

Profile at Aberdeen F.C. website

1992 births
Living people
Sportspeople from Cambuslang
Scottish footballers
Scotland youth international footballers
Scotland under-21 international footballers
Scotland international footballers
Association football midfielders
Rangers F.C. players
St Mirren F.C. players
Arbroath F.C. players
Aberdeen F.C. players
Norwich City F.C. players
Scottish Premier League players
Scottish Football League players
Scottish Professional Football League players
English Football League players
Premier League players
People educated at Cathkin High School
Footballers from South Lanarkshire